Euronext Growth is a multilateral trading facility (MTF) operated by Euronext. This equity trading market that was opened May 17, 2005 to address an opportunity posed by small to medium-sized firms that were anticipated to desire easier access to an equity market.

The approach was to provide streamlined listing requirements and simplified trading rules to present a lesser load on small and mid-cap firms. The goal was to do this in a manner that also preserved good governance and transparency for investors.

Euronext bills the Euronext Growth market as a unique option in the investing world. It aims to become the reference market for small and mid-sized companies throughout the Eurozone.

Financial services companies established in 2005
Growth